Chicago/The Blues/Today! is a series of three blues albums by various artists.  It was recorded in late 1965 and released in 1966.  It was remastered and released as a three-disc album in 1999.

In 1965 Samuel Charters at Vanguard Records asked nine different blues artists to come into the studio and record several songs each, so that he could produce a sampler of Chicago blues music.  The albums made a significant impression on some now-well-known American and English rock musicians, who at the time had not had much exposure to electric blues.

The artists featured on Chicago/The Blues/Today! are Junior Wells, J. B. Hutto, Otis Spann, James Cotton, Otis Rush, Homesick James, Johnny Young, Johnny Shines, and Big Walter Horton.  Also contributing are other musicians such as Buddy Guy, Willie Dixon, and Floyd Jones.

Track listing

Disc 1 / Volume 1 
The Junior Wells Chicago Blues Band
"Help Me"
"It Hurts Me Too"
"Messin' with the Kid"
"Vietcong Blues"
"All Night Long"
J. B. Hutto and His Hawks
"Going Ahead"
"Please Help"
"Too Much Alcohol"
"Married Woman Blues"
"That's the Truth"
Otis Spann's South Side Piano
"Marie"
"Burning Fire"
"S. P. Blues"
"Sometimes I Wonder"
"Spann's Stomp"

Disc 2 / Volume 2 
The Jimmy Cotton Blues Quartet
"Cotton Crop Blues"
"The Blues Keep Falling"
"Love Me or Leave"
"Rocket 88"
"West Helena Blues"
The Otis Rush Blues Band
"Everything's Going to Turn Out Alright"
"It's a Mean Old World"
"I Can't Quit You Baby"
"Rock"
"It's My Own Fault"
Homesick James and His Dusters
"Dust My Broom"
"Somebody Been Talkin'"
"Set a Date"
"So Mean to Me"

Disc 3 / Volume 3 
Johnny Young's South Side Blues Band
"One More Time"
"Kid Man Blues"
"My Black Mare"
"Stealin' Back"
"I Got Mine In Time"
"Tighten Up on It"
The Johnny Shines Blues Band
"Dynaflow Blues"
"Black Spider Blues"
"Layin' Down My Shoes and Clothes"
"If I Get Lucky"
Big Walter Horton's Blues Harp Band with Memphis Charlie
"Rockin' My Boogie"
The Johnny Shines Blues Band
"Mr. Boweevil"
"Hey, Hey"

Personnel

Musicians 
The Junior Wells Chicago Blues Band
Junior Wells – harmonica, vocals
Buddy Guy – guitar
Jack Myers – bass
Fred Below – drums

J. B. Hutto and His Hawks
J. B. Hutto – guitar, vocals
Herman Hassell – bass
Frank Kirkland – drums

Otis Spann's South Side Piano
Otis Spann – piano, vocals
S. P. Leary – drums

The Jimmy Cotton Quartet
Jimmy Cotton – harmonica, vocals
James Madison – guitar
Otis Spann – piano
S. P. Leary – drums

The Otis Rush Blues Band
Otis Rush – guitar, vocals
Robert "Sax" Crowder – alto saxophone
Luther Tucker – guitar
Roger Jones – bass
Willie Lion – drums

Homesick James and His Dusters
Homesick James – guitar, vocals
Willie Dixon – bass
Frank Kirkland – drums

Johnny Young's South Side Blues Band
Johnny Young – guitar, mandolin, vocals
Walter Horton – harmonica
Hayes Ware – bass
Elga Edmonds – drums

The Johnny Shines Blues Band
Johnny Shines – guitar, vocals
Walter Horton – harmonica
Floyd Jones – bass
Frank Kirkland – drums

Big Walter Horton's Blues Harp Band with Memphis Charlie
Walter Horton – harmonica
Memphis Charlie Musselwhite – harmonica
Johnny Shines – guitar
Floyd Jones – bass
Frank Kirkland – drums

Production 
Produced and annotated by Samuel Charters
Reissue production: Tom Vickers
Reissue engineering: Jeff Zaraya
Reissue additional notes: Ed Ward
Photography: Ann Charters, Ray Flerlage
Reissue package design: Drew Cartwright, Barry Ridge Graphic Design
Creative services manager: Georgette Cartwright, Vanguard Records

References 

Chicago blues albums
Vanguard Records albums
1966 albums